"Board Wages" is the third episode of the first series of the British television series, Upstairs, Downstairs. The episode is set in 1904. It is one of five episodes shot in black-and-white due to an industrial dispute.

"Board Wages" was among the episodes omitted from Upstairs, Downstairs''' initial Masterpiece Theatre'' broadcast in 1974, and was consequently not shown on US television until 1989.

Plot
In August 1904, the Bellamys are away summering in Scotland. The senior servants are also away. The junior servants carouse drunkenly through the house and mock their employers whilst dressed up as the family. They are caught by James Bellamy, the son of the family, who takes on the role of butler. Sarah continues her mocking and James kisses her. He promises not to disclose her misbehaviour. After this Sarah Moffat, annoyed by James's high-handed attitude, leaves Eaton Place.

References

Upstairs, Downstairs (series 1) episodes
1971 British television episodes
Fiction set in 1904